Dehnow Qalandari (also romanized as Dehnow Qalandarī; also known as Deh Now) is a village in Qarah Chaman Rural District, Arzhan District, Shiraz County, Fars Province, Iran. At the 2006 census, its population was 977, in 212 families.

References 

Populated places in Shiraz County